The 1934 Italian Grand Prix (formally the XII Gran Premio d'Italia) was a Grand Prix motor race, which was run on 9 September 1934 in Monza, Italy. The race lasted 502.28 km (4.330 x 116 laps).  It was the 12th running of the Italian Grand Prix.

After the fatal accidents of the previous year, it was decided to hold the race in a different configuration, using the main straight (in both directions, linked by a very tight hairpin just before the finish line), the southern corner of the oval, the southern corner of the road circuit and two double chicanes; it was the slowest configuration ever used in Monza.

Starting Grid (3x2)

Classifications 

Fastest Lap:  Hans Stuck (Auto Union A), 2'13.6", on lap 5

References 

Italian Grand Prix
Italian Grand Prix
Grand Prix